The Catedral de Albarracín is a Roman Catholic church in the town of Albarracín, province of Teruel, part of the autonomous community of Aragon, Spain.

History
The cathedral was built from 1572 to 1600, when the bell-tower was complete. Among the architects were Martín de Castañeda, Quinto Pierres Vedel, and Alonso del Barrio de Ajo. The church has a single nave and the ceiling has Gothic tracery. The nave interior and the Chapel of the Virgen del Pilar was redecorated in stucco and gilding in Baroque style.

The main retablo was completed in 1566 by Cosme Damián Bas.

References

Churches in Aragon
Roman Catholic cathedrals in Aragon
16th-century Roman Catholic church buildings in Spain
Roman Catholic churches completed in 1600